Wellington Eleutério Alves is a Brazilian flautist and composer.

He studied flute at the Universidade Estadual de Maringá. He currently plays with Orquestra Filarmônica Cesumar, Orquestra Sinfônica da Uem, Coral de Flautas da Uem. He is also the founding member of the Ensemble Ad Libitum, a group dedicated to contemporary music. Alves studied composition with Rael Toffolo at the Universidade Estadual de Maringá. His chamber music has been performed by several ensembles e.g. Ensemble Ad Libitum and Coral de Flautas.

Repertoire Selections

With Orquestra Filarmônica Cesumar
Camargo Guarnieri: Dança Brasileira
Dorival Caymmi: Suíte dos Pescadores
Ary Barroso: Aquarela do Brasil 
Hans Zimmer: Hedvigs Theme

With Ensemble Ad Libitum
Renato Segati de Moraes: Trio No. 1 (2010)
Renato Segati de Moraes: Atirei o Pau no Gato (2011)
Tauan Gonzalez Sposito: Fermáta, Op. 1 (2010)
Tauan Gonzalez Sposito: Correspondências, Op. 2 (2011)

Compositions
No Fun. No 1 
Trio No. 1
Ictus

References 

Classical flautists
Living people
Year of birth missing (living people)